Pierre De Bané,  (August 2, 1938 – January 9, 2019) was a Canadian senator.  He was the first Palestinian and the first person of Middle Eastern descent to be elected to the House of Commons of Canada in Matane and next Matapédia—Matane, and was a member of the Canadian Cabinet.

Early life and education
De Bané was born in Haifa, Palestine. His family then immigrated to Canada in 1947 to escape the looming war, and settled in Quebec. De Bané studied at Séminaire Saint-Joseph de Trois-Rivières, Collège Saint-Alexandre, University of Quebec and from law at Laval University.

Political career
He was first elected to the House of Commons of Canada in the 1968 general election, and served as a Member of Parliament for sixteen years.

In 1978, Prime Minister Pierre Trudeau appointed De Bané to the Canadian Cabinet as the Minister of Supply and Services. He joined the opposition bench when the Liberals lost the 1979 election, but was reappointed to the Cabinet as the Minister of Regional Economic Expansion when the Liberals returned to power in 1980 election.

In 1982, De Bané became Minister of State for External Relations and, eight months later, he became the Minister of Fisheries and Oceans. De Bané was named to the Senate by Trudeau days before he retired as Prime Minister.

De Bané was active on numerous Senate committees, particularly those dealing with fisheries, foreign affairs, and legal affairs and was also active in public life on the issue of Palestinian refugees.

He retired from the Senate upon turning 75 on August 2, 2013, and died on January 9, 2019, at the age of 80.

Archives 
There is a Pierre de Bané fonds at Library and Archives Canada.

References

External links
 
 Liberal Senate Forum

1938 births
2019 deaths
Lawyers in Quebec
Canadian senators from Quebec
Debane, Pierre
Liberal Party of Canada MPs
Liberal Party of Canada senators
Mandatory Palestine emigrants to Canada
Members of the House of Commons of Canada from Quebec
Members of the King's Privy Council for Canada
Officers of the National Order of the Cedar
University of Ottawa alumni
Université Laval alumni
21st-century Canadian politicians
Canadian politicians of Lebanese descent